The Engineering Heritage Awards, formally known as the Engineering Heritage Hallmark Scheme, were established by the Institution of Mechanical Engineers (IMechE) in 1984 to identify and promote artefacts, locations, collections and landmarks of significant engineering importance.

Development of the Awards

Engineering Heritage Hallmark Scheme (EHHS) 
In 1984, IMechE launched its Engineering Heritage Hallmark Scheme. For an object or artefact etc. to be considered for an award, an IMechE member would be required to complete a nomination form and submit it to the Institution. Upon submission, two referees would be appointed, one nominated by the Regional Committee where the object is located and a second independent referee. The submissions from both referees would then be reviewed by the Institution's Technical Support department before a decision was taken on the application.

Engineering Heritage Awards (EHA) 
In 2007, the Institution established the Heritage Committee to relaunch and promote the now renamed Engineering Heritage Awards. It simplified the application process, making it more transparent and with a quicker decision-making process. Furthermore, the criteria were changed, and the Institution's own library and information service became involved in the verification of details being submitted. The Award plaque was also redesigned (see below).

EHHA and EHA plaques 
Since 1984, the plaques presented to EHHS and EHA recipients have changed four times. The original plaque was a blue ceramic disc approximately 40 cm in wide. This was replaced in the 1990s by a rectangular steel plate mounted on a wooden base.

With the launch of the Engineering Heritage Awards in 2008, a new cast plaque was created. This was slightly modified in 2009 to reflect the rebranding of the Institution.

Engineering Heritage Award recipients

See also

 List of mechanical engineering awards

References

External links 

 IMechE Official website
 Engineering Heritage Awards website
 IMechE Information and Library website

Awards established in 1984
Historical markers
History of engineering
Industrial history of the United Kingdom
Awards of the Institution of Mechanical Engineers